Isopropylphenidate (also known as IPH and IPPD) is a piperidine based stimulant drug, closely related to methylphenidate, but with the methyl ester replaced by an isopropyl ester. It has similar effects to methylphenidate but with a longer duration of action, and was banned in the UK as a Temporary Class Drug from April 2015 following its unapproved sale as a designer drug.

It has been researched as potential methylphenidate replacement for ADHD and narcolepsy, because of fewer side effects.

See also 
 3,4-Dichloromethylphenidate
 Ethylphenidate
 Desoxypipradrol
 HDEP-28
 HDMP-28
 Propylphenidate

References 

2-Benzylpiperidines
Dopamine reuptake inhibitors
Stimulants
Designer drugs
Isopropyl esters
2-Piperidinyl compounds